Tomás Pedro González Barrios (born June 11, 1959) is a retired track and field sprinter from Cuba. He represented his country at the 1980 Summer Olympics, competing in the 100 metres, 200 metres and the 4 × 100 metres relay. He won several sprint medals at the Central American and Caribbean Championships in Athletics and was the gold medallist over 200 m at the 1983 Ibero-American Championships in Athletics.

International competitions

References

External links
All Athletics profile
1983 Year Ranking

1959 births
Living people
Cuban male sprinters
Olympic athletes of Cuba
Athletes (track and field) at the 1980 Summer Olympics
Athletes (track and field) at the 1983 Pan American Games
Pan American Games competitors for Cuba
Friendship Games medalists in athletics
20th-century Cuban people
21st-century Cuban people